Kara Vâsıf Bey (1880 – December 5, 1931), later known as Mustafa Vasıf Karakol, was an officer of the Ottoman Army, and a politician of the Republic of Turkey. He was one of the founding members of the Karakol society and his family took the surname "Karakol" after his death.

Early life

He traveled around the empire in early childhood due to his father civil service appointments. He eventually enlisted in the Military Academy in 1898. He was an officer in the Action Army which suppressed the 31 March rebellion. He resigned from army in 1916.

Political career 

He was one of the founding and most active member of the Karakol Society, which was established as an underground resistance organization in reaction to occupation of Istanbul at the end of WWI. After numerous military leaders moved to Anatolian hinterland to launch the War of Independence, he was the key link them and represented Association for the Defence of National Rights of Anatolia and Rumelia. He was elected to the last and 4th Ottoman Parliament as representative of Sivas. Eventually he was arrested by the occupation authorities and imprisoned at Malta. After his return, he was again elected to the 1st TBMM from Sivas.

He was arrested in 1926 with suspicion of participating in the attempt (İzmir plot) on life of Ataturk. Eventually he was cleared of all charges and freed. Later in life he was involved in private business.

Medals and decorations
Medal of Independence with Green Ribbon

See also
Karakol society

Sources

1880 births
1931 deaths
People from 'Asir Province
Ottoman Military Academy alumni
Ottoman Military College alumni
Ottoman Army officers
Ottoman military personnel of the Balkan Wars
Ottoman military personnel of World War I
Turkish people of the Turkish War of Independence
Malta exiles
Deputies of Sivas
Progressive Republican Party (Turkey) politicians
Recipients of the Medal of Independence with Green Ribbon (Turkey)